Richard Laurence Weldon (December 26, 1932 – July 25, 2020) was a Canadian politician. He represented the electoral district of Dartmouth East in the Nova Scotia House of Assembly from 1978 to 1984. He is a member of the Nova Scotia Progressive Conservative Party.

Early life
Weldon was born in Halifax, Nova Scotia. He attended Dalhousie University where he earned a Bachelor of Laws degree, and was a lawyer. He is the grandson of Richard Chapman Weldon, founder and first dean of Dalhousie Law School.

Political career
Weldon has served on Dartmouth City Council, and is a former deputy mayor of the city.

Personal life
He is married to Joan Devanney. Weldon died on July 25, 2020.

References

1932 births
2020 deaths
Dalhousie University alumni
Progressive Conservative Association of Nova Scotia MLAs
People from Halifax, Nova Scotia
People from Dartmouth, Nova Scotia